The golden-browed warbler (Basileuterus belli) is a species of bird in the family Parulidae, the New World warblers.
It is found in El Salvador, Guatemala, Honduras, and Mexico.
Its natural habitat is subtropical or tropical moist montane forests.

References

External links
Golden-browed warbler photo gallery VIREO
Photo-High Res ; Article mtaudubon–"Western Mexico"

golden-browed warbler
Birds of Central America
Birds of Mexico
Birds of Guatemala
Birds of Honduras
golden-browed warbler
golden-browed warbler
Taxonomy articles created by Polbot
Birds of the Sierra Madre Occidental
Birds of the Trans-Mexican Volcanic Belt